Spin up may refer to:

 Neutron star spin-up, the increase in rotational speed over time in neutron stars
 Spin-up, the process of starting rotating storage
 Spin up, a direction of spin in quantum mechanics
 Spin Up, a 2012 video game